Cut It Out may refer to:

 Cut It Out (book), a book by artist Banksy
 Cut It Out (EP), an EP by Kitten
 "Cut It Out" (song), a song by The Go-Betweens from the album Tallulah
 "Cut It Out", a song by Nelly from the album Brass Knuckles